Anthony Greenfield (11 December 1931 – August 2004) was a British sports shooter. He competed in the men's 50 metre rifle, prone event at the 1976 Summer Olympics.

References

1931 births
2004 deaths
British male sport shooters
Olympic shooters of Great Britain
Shooters at the 1976 Summer Olympics
People from Croydon